The Democratic Forces for Progress was a political alliance in Burkina Faso (former Upper Volta. 
It existed in the early 1990s and consisted of the following political parties:

Movement for Socialist Democracy
African Independence Party
Movement of Progressive Democrats
Burkinabè Socialist Party
Union of Social Democrats

Its leader was Issa Dominique Konate.

Defunct political party alliances in Burkina Faso